Kakapo Nunatak is the southern of two similar nunataks that lie  apart and  north-northeast of Mount Bird in northwestern Ross Island. Kakapo Nunatak is one of several features near Mount Bird assigned the native name of a New Zealand mountain bird, in this case the kakapo. It was named by the New Zealand Geographic Board in 2000.

References

Nunataks of Ross Island